Krzyżanów may refer to the following places in Poland:
Krzyżanów, Lower Silesian Voivodeship (south-west Poland)
Krzyżanów, Kutno County in Łódź Voivodeship (central Poland)
Krzyżanów, Piotrków County in Łódź Voivodeship (central Poland)